Cythara paucicostata is a species of sea snail, a marine gastropod mollusk in the family Mangeliidae.

This species is considered a nomen dubium.

Description
The length of the shell attains 7 mm, its diameter 3 mm.

(Original description) The wholly white shell has an oblong, ovate shape. The spire is rather short, turreted and acute. The whorls are angulated at the sutures, longitudinally ribbed. There are 7 ribs, very prominent, compressed, running into the sutures. The interstices are concave, finely, regularly and closely striate transversely. The sutures are deep.

Distribution
This marine species occurs off Tahiti and Polynesia.

References

External links
  Tucker, J.K. 2004 Catalog of recent and fossil turrids (Mollusca: Gastropoda). Zootaxa 682: 1–1295.

paucicostata
Gastropods described in 1867